Gregory Leeb (born May 31, 1977) is a Canadian former professional ice hockey centre, who last played for the Coventry Blaze in the Elite Ice Hockey League. He played 2 games for the Dallas Stars in the 2000–01 season. Greg is the brother of Brad Leeb.

Playing career
Leeb got his start with the Spokane Chiefs in the Western Hockey League, where he played from 1994–1998. In four seasons with the Chiefs Leeb scored 127 goals and 164 assists for 291 points in 276 career games with the Chiefs. Leeb then played for the Michigan K-Wings (1998–2000), followed by stints with the Utah Grizzlies (2000–01), Hamilton Bulldogs (2001–02), and Augsburger Panther (2002–03). After one season Leeb joined fellow German club, the Sinupret Ice Tigers, where he has played since 2003. For the 2012/2013 Elite Ice Hockey League campaign, Leeb has joined the Coventry Blaze.
He is now retired.

Career statistics

Awards and achievements
 Named to the WHL West Second All-Star Team in 1998

References

External links

1977 births
Living people
Augsburger Panther players
Canadian ice hockey centres
Dallas Stars players
Hamilton Bulldogs (AHL) players
Sportspeople from Red Deer, Alberta
Nürnberg Ice Tigers players
Sinupret Ice Tigers players
Spokane Chiefs players
Undrafted National Hockey League players
Utah Grizzlies (IHL) players
Ice hockey people from Alberta
Canadian expatriate ice hockey players in Germany
Canadian expatriate ice hockey players in the United States